Hyphessobrycon boulengeri is a species of tetra belonging to the family charicidae. It is native to South America. It inhabits the Rio Grande do Sul, Brazil.

The fish was named in honor of ichthyologist-herpetologist George A. Boulenger (1858-1937), of the British Museum of Natural History.

Description 
H. boulengeri is a buff colored fish resembling other hyphessobrycon species such as the black phantom tetra with a black patch behind the head. Its head itself is dotted brown. Boulengeri also has yellow fin rays.

References

External links 

Tetras
Taxa named by Carl H. Eigenmann
Fish described in 1907